South Brookfield is a hamlet in Madison County, New York, United States. The ZIP code that covers South Brookfield is 13485.

References

Hamlets in Madison County, New York
Hamlets in New York (state)